The 1946 season was the 16th completed season of Finnish Football League Championship, which culminated in a final between the winners of the Palloliiton league and the Työväen Urheiluliiton league.

Final
 TPV Tampere 2–5 VIFK Vaasa
 VIFK Vaasa 0–1 TPV Tampere

Replay: VIFK Vaasa 5–1 TPV Tampere

References
Finland - List of final tables (RSSSF)

Mestaruussarja seasons
Fin
Fin
Mestaruussarja